Saint Vladimir's is a former Ukrainian Catholic minor seminary in Roblin, Manitoba.

History 
"The history of St. Vladimir's College is closely tied to the history of the Ukrainian Greek Catholic Church in Canada. Roman Catholic Redemptorist missionaries from Belgium were sent to Canada in the first decade of the 20th century in order to serve the growing population of Ukrainian immigrants in the prairie provinces. Settling in Yorkton, Saskatchewan in 1904 they opened a monastery and church within ten years.  By 1917, they had seen the need to educate and groom young Canadian-born men for service in the church and they accepted their first two students as minor seminarians. By 1936, after years of uncertainty, the minor seminary re-opened with the intent of educating young men in the Byzantine Rite. As this was the Rite of the majority of the Ukrainian immigrants, the institution was  most welcomed and highly successful. The Ukrainian priests and their operation of the Yorkton Minor Seminary were instrumental in keeping alive the faith of the Ukrainian immigrants on the Canadian prairies and an essential factor in the growth of the Ukrainian Greek Catholic Church in Canada."

See also 
 St. Volodymyr Museum
 St. Volodymyr's Ukrainian Orthodox Cathedral (Toronto)
 St. Volodymyr Kyiv University

References

Defunct universities and colleges in Canada
Ukrainian Catholic Church in Canada
Seminaries and theological colleges in Canada
Educational institutions established in 1936
Ukrainian-Canadian culture in Manitoba
1936 establishments in Canada